Enzo Cerusico (22 October 1937 – 26 November 1991) was an Italian film actor. He appeared in more than 50 films between 1951 and 1984.

Career in the United States
Cerusico's first role on American television was in a 1966 episode of I Spy filmed in Rome. Producer Sheldon Leonard held a casting call for an English-speaking actor to play the kid brother of the female Italian guest star. Cerusico spoke no English but with a friend's help he memorized one line — "I studied English in the school since four years" — and managed to bluff his way into an interview with Leonard.

Leonard realized Cerusico wasn't fluent in English but he thought the young man possessed "Jean Paul Belmondo's jaunty virility and the swaggering charm of Maurice Chevalier." Leonard chose Cerusico for the I Spy guest role and Cerusico learned his lines phonetically and delivered them by rote.

Cerusico later played the title character in My Friend Tony, an hour-long crime drama that aired on NBC in 1969.

Personal life
Cerusico's family had hoped he would follow tradition and become a physician. But during his teen years, Cerusico realized he wouldn't be a good doctor and decided he "didn't want to be one among many, a mediocre."

While living in Los Angeles during filming of My Friend Tony, Enzo and Tiziana learned English by reading Ernest Hemingway's short stories and watching Walter Cronkite's evening newscasts. The couple used an audio tape recorder to record the CBS Evening News each night and replayed the tape three times, Enzo said: "First for the separate words, then for the sentences and finally to find out what the news was." Publicity materials released in 1969 for My Friend Tony gave the 32-year-old Cerusico's age as 25.

Selected filmography

 Heart and Soul (1948) - Nelli
 Feathers in the Wind (1950) - Little patriot
 Brief Rapture (1951)
 I due derelitti (1951)
 Viva il cinema! (1952) - (uncredited)
 Red Shirts (1952) - Ciceruacchio's son
 In Olden Days (1952) - The drummer (segment "Il tamburino sardo")
 The Angels of the District (1952) - Il Capo
 La figlia del diavolo (1952)
 Una croce senza nome (1952)
 It's Never Too Late (1953) - Antonio Trabbi bambino
 Guendalina (1957) - Postino
 La Dolce Vita (1960) - Fotografo
 Il Mattatore (1960) - Benito Mesci (uncredited)
 Siege of Syracuse (1960) - Giovane allievo (uncredited)
 Colossus and the Amazon Queen (1960) - Menandro
 Il gobbo (1960) - Scheggia
 Ghosts of Rome (1961) - L'uomo corteggiamento giovane
 Tiro al piccione (1961) - Montaldo - the shepherd killed
 Cronache del '22 (1961) - (segment "Giorno di paga")
 Romolo e Remo (1961) - Numa Pompilio
 Pugni pupe e marinai (1961) - Raffaele Bottari
 Cartouche (1962) - Un bandit
 Duel of Fire (1962) - Policeman
 Hercules, Samson and Ulysses (1963) - Ulysses
 Blood and Black Lace (1964) - Gas Station Attendant
 In ginocchio da te (1964) - Gualtiero - cousin of Carla
 Extraconiugale (1964) - Manovale (segment "La doccia")
 Una storia di notte (1964) - Il Matto
 Mondo pazzo... gente matta! (1966) - Marco - The Cello Player
 Me, Me, Me... and the Others (1966)
  (1966) - Gru (uncredited)
 Tre notti violente (1966)
 Maigret a Pigalle (1966) - Albert
 Mi vedrai tornare (1966) - Lt. Saro Spampinato
 Faustina (1968) - Enea Troiani
 L'invasion (1970) - Piero Nato
 Per amore o per forza (1971)
 Racconti proibiti... di niente vestiti (1972) - Romeo
 The Dead Are Alive (1972) - Alberto
 Meo Patacca (1972) - Marco Pepe
 Anche se volessi lavorare, che faccio? (1972) - Girasole
 No, the Case Is Happily Resolved (1973) - Fabio Santamaria
 The Five Days aka Le Cinque Giornate (1973) - Romolo Marcelli
 Zorro (1975) - Joaquín, Don Diego's Servant
 Amore mio spogliati... che poi ti spiego! (1975) - Alberto Donati
 A.A.A. cercasi spia... disposta spiare per conto spie (1976) - Giovanni Sebastiano Bacchi
 La lozana andaluza (1976) - Rampín
 Occhio alla vedova (1976)
 7 ragazze di classe (1979) - Roberto Galíndez
 Scusi lei è normale? (1979) - Nicola Proietti / 'Nicole'
 Uno scugnizzo a New York (1984) - Anna's Father
 Treasure Island in Outer Space (1987, TV Mini-Series) - Augustine

References

External links

1937 births
1991 deaths
Italian male film actors
Italian male child actors
Male actors from Rome
Deaths from cancer in Lazio
20th-century Italian male actors